Lévis was a federal electoral district in Quebec, Canada, that was represented in the House of Commons of Canada from 1867 to 2004. It was created by the British North America Act, 1867. From 1998 to 2003, it was known as Lévis-et-Chutes-de-la-Chaudière. It was abolished in 2003 when it was redistributed into Lévis—Bellechasse and Lotbinière—Chutes-de-la-Chaudière ridings.

History

The Lévis electoral district consisted initially of the County of Lévis.  During 1924, it was redefined to specifically include the City of Lévis.

During 1933, it was redefined to consist of only the parts of the county of Lévis included in the city of Lévis, town of Lauzon, Village de Charny, and the municipalities of St-David de l'Aube-Rivière, Ste-Hélène-de-Breakeyville, St-Joseph-de-la-Pointe-de-Lévis, St-Louis-de-Gonzague-de-Pintendre, St-Romuald d'Etchemin and St-Télesphore.

Subsequently, during 1947, it was redefined to consist of the country of Lévis, excluding the municipalities of Rivière-Boyer, St. Henri-de-Lauzon and the village of St. Henri, and including the city of Lévis and the town of Lauzon.

In 1966, it was redefined to consist of:
 the Cities of Lauzon and Lévis;
 the Towns of Saint-David-de-l'Auberivière, Saint-Jean-Chrysostôme, Saint-Nicolas and Saint-Romuald-d'Etchemin;
 the county of Lévis;
 in the County of Dorchester: the village municipalities of Saint-Bernard and Saint-Isidore; the parish municipalities of Saint-Bernard, Sainte-Hénédine, Saint-Isidore, Sainte-Marguerite and Saint-Maxime; the municipality of Taschereau-Fortier; and
 in the County of Lotbinière: the village municipalities of Francoeur, Saint-Agapitville, Sainte-Agathe, Saint-Patrice-de-Beaurivage and Saint-Sylvestre; the parish municipalities of Saint-Agapit-de-Beaurivage, Sainte-Agathe, Saint-Apollinaire, Saint-Gilles, Saint-Narcisse-de-Beaurivage, Saint-Patrice-de-Beaurivage and Saint-Sylvestre.

In 1976, it was redefined to consist of:
 the Cities of Lauzon, Lévis and Saint-Romuald-d'Etchemin;
 the Towns of Charny, Saint-David-de-l'Auberivière, Saint-Jean-Chrysostôme and Saint-Nicolas;
 the County of Lévis;
 in the County of Bellechasse: the village municipality of Saint Charles; the parish municipalities of Saint-Charles-Borromée and Saint-Étienne-de-Beaumont;
 in the County of Dorchester: the village municipalities of Saint-Anselme, Saint-Bernard and Saint-Isidore; the parish municipalities of Saint-Anselme, Saint-Bernard, Sainte-Hénédine, Saint-Isidore and Saint-Maxime; the municipality of Taschereau-Fortier; and
 in the County of Lotbinière: the village municipalities of Saint-Agapitville and Saint-Patrice-de-Beaurivage; the parish municipalities of Saint-Agapit-de-Beaurivage, Saint-Gilles, Saint-Narcisse-de-Beaurivage and Saint-Patrice-de-Beaurivage.

In 1987, it was redefined to consist of:
 the Towns of Charny, Lauzon, Lévis, Saint-David-de-l'Auberivière, Saint-Jean-Chrysostome, Saint-Nicholas, Saint-Rédempteur and Saint-Romuald;
 the County of Lévis; and
 in the County of Lotbinière: the parish municipality of Saint-Narcisse-de-Beaurivage.

In 1996, it was redefined to consist of:
 the cities of Charny, Lévis, Saint-Jean-Chrysostome, Saint-Nicolas, Saint-Rédempteur and Saint-Romuald;
 the County Regional Municipality of Desjardins;
 the County Regional Municipality of Les Chutes-de-la-Chaudière, excepting the Parish Municipality of Saint-Lambert-de-Lauzon.

In 1998, it renamed "Lévis-et-Chutes-de-la-Chaudière". It was abolished in 2003 when it was redistributed between into Lévis—Bellechasse and Lotbinière—Chutes-de-la-Chaudière ridings.

Members of Parliament
This riding elected the following Members of Parliament:

Election results

Lévis

Lévis-et-Chutes-de-la-Chaudière

See also 

 List of Canadian federal electoral districts
 Past Canadian electoral districts

External links 

Riding history from the Library of Parliament:
Levis
Levis-et-Chutes-de-la-Chaudière

Former federal electoral districts of Quebec
Politics of Lévis, Quebec